Russia Report can mean:

 In the United States, the 2019 Mueller Report
 In the United Kingdom, the 2020 Intelligence and Security Committee Russia report